The 26th Dáil was elected at the 1989 general election on 15 June 1989 and met on 29 June 1989. The members of Dáil Éireann, the house of representatives of the Oireachtas (legislature) of Ireland, are known as TDs. The 26th Dáil lasted  days, and saw a change of Taoiseach from Charles Haughey to Albert Reynolds. The 26th Dáil was dissolved by President Mary Robinson on 5 November 1992, at the request of the Taoiseach Albert Reynolds. There were no by-elections during the 26th Dáil.

Composition of the 26th Dáil

On 12 July 1989, Fianna Fáil and the Progressive Democrats, denoted with bullets, formed the 21st Government of Ireland, led by Charles Haughey. On 11 February 1992, they formed the 22nd Government of Ireland led by Albert Reynolds. The Progressive Democrats left the government on 4 November 1992.

Graphical representation
This is a graphical comparison of party strengths in the 26th Dáil from June 1989. This was not the official seating plan.

Ceann Comhairle
On 29 June 1989, Seán Treacy (Ind) was proposed by Charles Haughey for the position of Ceann Comhairle. Alan Dukes proposed Paddy Harte for the position. Treacy was approved by a vote of 87 to 78.

TDs by constituency
The list of the 166 TDs elected is given in alphabetical order by Dáil constituency.

Changes

See also
Members of the 19th Seanad

References

External links
Houses of the Oireachtas: Debates: 26th Dáil

 
26th Dáil
26